The 2021 World Wrestling Olympic Qualification Tournament was the last wrestling qualification tournament for the 2020 Summer Olympics in Tokyo, Japan. The event was held from 6 to 9 May 2021, in Sofia, Bulgaria.

Qualification summary 

A total of 36 athletes secured a spot in the 2020 Summer Olympics, in Tokyo, Japan. Two spots were given to each of the weight classes in every event. This allows a total of 12 available spots for each event. Every winner and runner-up per class were awarded their place for wrestling, at the 2020 Summer Olympics. Quota places are allocated to the respective NOC and not to the competitor that achieved the place in the qualification event.

Men's freestyle

57 kg
6–7 May

65 kg
6–7 May

74 kg
6–7 May

86 kg
6–7 May

97 kg
6–7 May

125 kg
6–7 May

 Sumit Malik originally qualified for the Olympics, but was later disqualified for doping, giving the spot to Aiaal Lazarev.

Men's Greco-Roman

60 kg
8–9 May

67 kg
8–9 May

77 kg
8–9 May

87 kg
8–9 May

97 kg
8–9 May

130 kg
8–9 May

Women's freestyle

50 kg
7–8 May

53 kg
7–8 May

57 kg
7–8 May

62 kg
7–8 May

68 kg
7–8 May

76 kg
7–8 May

See also 
2020 Pan American Wrestling Olympic Qualification Tournament
2021 European Wrestling Olympic Qualification Tournament
2021 African & Oceania Wrestling Olympic Qualification Tournament
2021 Asian Wrestling Olympic Qualification Tournament

References

External links
United World Wrestling

Qualification World
Olympic Q World
World Wrestling Olympic Qualification Tournament
World Wrestling Olympic Qualification Tournament
International wrestling competitions hosted by Bulgaria
Sports competitions in Sofia